The Keystone School District is a small, rural public school district in Clarion County, Pennsylvania. It serves the boroughs of Shippenville, Knox, and Callensburg, as well as the townships of Beaver Township, Elk Township, Licking Township, Ashland Township, and Salem Township. The Keystone School District encompasses approximately 126 square miles. According to 2000 federal census data, it serves a resident population of 7,589. In 2009, the district residents' per capita income was $16,347, while the median family income was $39,271.

The Keystone School District operates two schools: an elementary school and a combined junior/senior high school, both of which are located in Knox.

Extracurriculars
The district provides a wide variety of clubs, activities and 18 interscholastic sports.

High School Athletics 
Keystone participates in PIAA District IX (9)

References

School districts in Clarion County, Pennsylvania
School districts established in 1972